This is the first edition of the tournament that was played in Mumbai. Last year champions (in Ho Chi Minh City) were Lars Burgsmüller and Philipp Kohlschreiber. None competed this year.

Mario Ančić and Mahesh Bhupathi won the title by defeating Rohan Bopanna and Mustafa Ghouse 6–4, 6–7(6–8), [10–8] in the final.

Seeds

Draw

Draw

References

External links
 Official results archive (ATP)
 Official results archive (ITF)

Doubles